"Jealous Minds Think Alike" is the fourth single by You Me at Six, and the third from their debut album Take Off Your Colours. As their first charting single, it charted at no. 100 in the UK Singles Chart. It was released on 29 September 2008.

Track listing
 "Jealous Minds Think Alike" - 3:38		
 "Blue Eyes Don't Lie" - 3:33

Personnel 
 Josh Franceschi - Lead Vocals 
 Max Helyer - Rhythm Guitar 
 Chris Miller - Lead Guitar 
 Matt Barnes - Bass 
 Dan Flint - Drums / Percussion

References

2008 singles
You Me at Six songs
2008 songs
Songs written by Josh Franceschi